Inés Rodena (April 20, 1905 in Havana, Cuba – April 15, 1985 in Miami, USA) was a Cuban radio and television writer.

Life and career
Before becoming a writer Rodena worked as a nurse. Through her experiences with her patients and stories recounted by people with whom she came in contact, her passion for writing was born.

In the 50s she wrote her first novel, La Gata (The Cat) for radio, which was a great success. In 1968 she brought La Gata to television with great success under the production of the Venezuelan state television channel.

In 1969 she went to work at Radio Caracas Television. In 1971, she recorded La usurpadora (The Usurper). Agnes' novels all met with great success, being recorded in Mexico, Venezuela and other Latin American countries. Rachel, Rina, Viviana, Los ricos también lloran (The Rich Also Cry), and Rosa salvaje (Wild Rose) are some of her greatest hits.

She died on April 15, 1985, aged 79.

Filmography
 Abandonada
 Ambición
 Charito Carvajal
 Corina Bazán
 Cuando la rival es una hija
 Cuando se regala un hijo
 Domenica Montero
 Enamorada
 Entre sombras
 Ileana
 La bastarda
 La doctorcita
 La galleguita
 La gata
 La gaviota
 La madrastra
 La mesera
 La señorita Amalia
 La usurpadora
 La virgen de Barlovento
 La virgen de Cerro
 Lágrimas negras
 Los ricos también lloran
 Mademoseville Fabian
 María Mercé la mulata
 María Salomé
 Milagro de amor
 Muchachas de hoy
 Nosotros los pobres
 Pobre Millonaria
 Regina Carbonell
 Sacrificio de mujer
 Valentina

References

1905 births
1985 deaths
Cuban screenwriters
Women television writers
Cuban radio writers
Women radio writers
Writers from Havana
20th-century Cuban women writers
20th-century screenwriters
Cuban emigrants to the United States